Municipal police, city police, or local police are law enforcement agencies that are under the control of local government. This includes the municipal government, where it is the smallest administrative subdivision. They receive funding from the city budget, and may have fewer legal powers than the "state paid" police. These police forces usually report to a mayor or a local police board.

Historical development 
Historically, the role of the municipal police of local civic protection was carried out by municipal guards. Today, some formations of municipal police still carry the name of the city/communal/municipal guard.

Municipal police by country

See also 
 County police
 Garde champêtre
 Metropolitan police
 Police area
 Provincial police (Italy)

References 

 
Law enforcement occupations
Law enforcement units